Fântânele (historical name: Inancișmea) is a commune in Constanța County, Northern Dobruja,  Romania, including the village with the same name.

The commune was established in 2005 by detaching the Fântânele village from the Cogealac commune.

The Fântânele-Cogealac Wind Farm (with an installed nameplate capacity of 600 MW) is partly located on the territory of the commune.

Demographics
At the 2011 census, Fântânele had 1,553 Romanians (99.94%), 1 others (0.06%).

References

Communes in Constanța County
Localities in Northern Dobruja